Who's the Boss in the Factory? is the third studio album by Swedish symphonic rock band Karmakanic. It was released through Inside Out Music on 18 November 2008.

Track listing
All songs written by Jonas Reingold and Inger Ohlén Reingold, except where noted.

 "Send a Message from the Heart" – 19:28
 "Let in Hollywood"(Jonas Reingold) – 4:53 
 "Who's the Boss in the Factory" – 13:04
 "Two Blocks from the Edge"  – 9:51
 "Eternally Pt:I"  – 1:51
 "Eternally Pt:II" – 6:21

Personnel

Karmakanic
 Göran Edman – vocals
 Krister Jonsson – electric and acoustic guitars, keyboards, additional bass
 Lalle Larsson – keyboards
 Jonas Reingold – electric and fretless bass, additional keyboards
 Zoltan Csorsz – drums, percussion

Additional musicians
 Tomas Bodin – keyboards
 Johan Glössner, Krister Jonsson and Elias Kalvik – guitars
 Lelo Nika – accordion
 Rob Palmen – vocals
 Roine Stolt – twelve-string guitar, organ and percussion
 Andy Tillison – organ and synthesizer
 Theo Travis – saxophone

Production
 Produced By Jonas Reingold
 Recorded and engineered by Tomas Bodin, Jonas Reingold and Roine Stolt
 Mixed by Magnus Axelsson and Jonas Reingold
 Mastered by Magnus Axelsson

References

External links
Karmakanic Official Site
Karmakanic's Official MySpace page

Karmakanic albums
2008 albums
Inside Out Music albums